Telkupi (or Tailakampi) is a submerged location of archaeological interest in Purulia district of West Bengal, India. The area, along with most of the temples situated there, was submerged in 1959 as a consequence to the construction of a dam across Damodar river at Panchet in Dhanbad district, then in Bihar.

Geography

Location
Telkupi is located at 

Note: The map alongside presents some of the notable locations in the subdivision. All places marked in the map are linked in the larger full screen map.

History 
Formerly known as Tailakampi, Telkupi is the capital of Rudrasikhara, a local ruler of the area in 11th century, who helped Pala king, Ramapala, to recover Varendra from Bhima. The royal chronicle of Panchkot Raj of Shikhar dynasty mentions that Rudrashikhara rose to power in 1098 AD. India historian Niharranjan Ray assumes that he ruled from 1070 to 1120. Sandhyakar Nandi in his poem Ramacharitam comments that like a wildfire, Rudrasikhara, was an expert in warfare, crushed the pride of the rulers of rivers and mountains.

Tailakampi was a commercial hub in 10th to 13th century. It is believed that most of the temples were funded by the 'Banik' or business people.

Temples

Description by Beglar 
In 1878, an Armenian-Indian archeologist Joseph David Beglar, gave the first ever description about the temples of Telkupi in his report to the Archaeological Survey of India. According to his report, the place was full of temples and the number was higher than any other place in the Chota Nagpur Plateau region. The temples were divided into three clusters, the largest group among them was situated to the north of Telkupi village near the Damodar river, the second group to the west of the village and the third group to the south-eastern part of the village.

First group of temples 
The temple was not much ornamented. Beglar noticed that the upper part of the temple was almost intact at the time of his report.
 No. 2: This south-facing stone-made temple had a sculpture of Gajalakshmi over the entrance, with a lingam inside. Beglar found the upper portion of the temple broken and accumulated sand in the cell rose  of the still of entrance.
 No. 4: This east-facing almost-ruined temple had a sculpture of lotus over the entrance and a well-preserved four-armed statue of Vishnu was inside the temple as the deity of worship.
 No. 5: This east-facing temple, had a sculpture of Ganesha over the entrance. Beglar found the upper portion of the temple missing.

Telkupi picture gallery

References

External links

  – it includes Telkupi

Tourist attractions in Purulia district